BDPC (systematic name 4-(4-bromophenyl)-4-(dimethylamino)-1-(2-phenylethyl)cyclohexanol; also known as bromadol) is a potent narcotic analgesic with a distinctive arylcyclohexylamine chemical structure. It was developed by Daniel Lednicer at Upjohn in the 1970s. Initial studies estimated that it was around 10,000 times the strength of morphine in animal models. However, later studies using more modern techniques assigned a value of 504 times the potency of morphine for the more active trans-isomer. This drug was first seized along with three kilograms of acetylfentanyl in an April 25, 2013 police action in Montreal, Canada, and has reportedly continued to be available on the designer drug black market internationally. Analogues where the para-bromine is replaced by chlorine or a methyl group retain similar activity, as does the meta-hydroxyl derivative.

See also 
 3-OH-PCP
 4-Keto-PCP
 C-8813
 Cebranopadol 
 Ciramadol
 Dimetamine
 Faxeladol
 Profadol
 Tapentadol
 Tramadol

References 

Arylcyclohexylamines
Dimethylamino compounds
Mu-opioid receptor agonists
Bromoarenes
Synthetic opioids